Black and Blue is a 1998 novel by Anna Quindlen, and was chosen as an Oprah's Book Club selection in April 1998.

Plot
For eighteen years, Fran Benedetto kept her secret. And hid her bruises. And stayed with Bobby because she wanted her son to have a father. And because, in spite of everything, she loved him. Then one night, when she saw the look on her ten-year-old son's face, Fran finally made a choice and ran for both their lives...

Now she is starting over in a city far from home, far from Bobby. And in this place she uses a name that isn't hers, and cradles her son in her arms, and tries to forget. For the woman who now calls herself Beth, every day is a chance to heal, to put together the pieces of her shattered self.

And despite the flawlessness of her escape, Fran Benedetto is certain of one thing: It is only a matter of time...

Adaptations

Film

Black and Blue is a 1999 American made-for-TV movie. Based on the novel by Anna Quindlen directed by Paul Shapiro.  After a woman's husband beats and abuses her, she and her son join the witness protection program and move away secretly.

Enough is a 2002 American drama-thriller film directed by Michael Apted. It stars Jennifer Lopez as Slim, an abused wife who learns to fight back. Enough garnered generally negative reviews from film critics, although several aspects of the film including the actors’ performances were praised.

1998 American novels
Novels set in Florida
American novels adapted into films
American novels adapted into television shows